Ole Nilsen Ravna (31 October 1841 - 11 August 1906) was a Northern Saami adventurer, explorer and reindeer herder. He skied with Fridtjof Nansen across Greenland in 1888–89.

Biography

Ole Nilsen Ravna was born on October 31, 1841, in Karasjok, Norway. Reindeer herding was typical work for Saami, Ole Ravna had his own herd of reindeers.

When Ravna was forty-six years old, he became a member of the Greenland expedition (1888-1889). The head of expedition, Fridtjof Nansen, was displeased with him, because Ravna had a family and motion sickness. For the last reason, Ole and his compatriot Samuel Balto had been reading the New Testament during storms.

The members of the expedition had a long way to go. They were faced with a harsh climate, but Ravna and Balto felt good. Finally, six members of the expedition passed over the Greenland ice sheet and came to the Nuuk. But when they arrived, all the ships had sailed away. For this reason, expedition stayed there for the winter. They were able to continue their journey on 15 April 1889. The explorers arrived in Copenhagen on 21 May. Finally, the expedition came back to the Oslo nine days later 

Ole Ravna was awarded a silver medal for his membership in this expedition.

In 1905 sixty-four-year-old Ole Ravna went with his compatriot Isak Klemetsen and Knud Rasmussen to the Greenland again. They wanted to develop reindeer herding there.

Ole Ravna died on 11 August 1906 in Porsanger, Norway. He was buried in the Lakselv cemetery.

A monument in memory of Ravna and Balto was put in Karasjok in 2011.

References

Inline citations

Sources referenced

 Kublitskij Georgij (1967). Nansen. His life and adventures. Moscow: Detskaya literatura.

External links 
 Ole Ravna
 Ole Nilsen Ravna

Norwegian polar explorers
Norwegian Sámi people
1841 births
1906 deaths
People from Karasjok
Fridtjof Nansen